Clazz may refer to:

, a deliberate misspelling of the reserved word 
Clazz, a dormant component of Apache Commons
Clazz, a musical style invented by Surendran Reddy
Clazz (Classical Jazz), a 2011 album by Calvin Newborn